Pinecreek is an unincorporated community in Dieter Township, Roseau County, Minnesota, United States, near the Canada–US border. The community is located northwest of Roseau at the junction of State Highway 89 (MN 89) and Roseau County Road 3.

Pinecreek is the location of Piney Pinecreek Border Airport, which straddles the Canada–US border. The community took its name from nearby Pine Creek which flows through the community. A post office called Pinecreek was established in 1896, and remained in operation until 1975. Nearby places include Roseau, Badger, and Piney, Manitoba.

See also
 Pinecreek–Piney Border Crossing

References

 Rand McNally Road Atlas – 2007 edition – Minnesota entry
 Official State of Minnesota Highway Map – 2013/2014 edition

Unincorporated communities in Minnesota
Unincorporated communities in Roseau County, Minnesota